Lady Jamshedjee Road, better known as "L.J. Road", is a major road that runs through Mahim in Mumbai . It is named in honour of Lady Jamshetjee Jeejeebhoy, a philanthropic Parsi lady who funded the construction of Mahim causeway.
 
L.J. Road is a busy thoroughfare much used by road conveyances commuting between South Mumbai and West Mumbai. It is essentially an extension of Swami Vivekanand Road and the Mahim Causeway.

Landmarks
Several prominent landmarks of the area, are located on the road. These include:
St. Michael's church, Mahim
The Mahim Dargah
The Sitala Devi temple
Citylight movie theatre
iService Center
Sena Bhavan, headquarters of the Shiv Sena
Janta Tea House (famous Teas stall established in 1969)
Additionally, the road provides access to Shivaji Park, Hinduja Hospital, Bombay Scottish School and Plaza theatre, all of which lie just off the road.

References

Streets in Mumbai